Training Dike Recreation Area, also called Training Dike Day-Use Area is a U.S. Army Corps of Engineers public recreation area located immediately downstream of Gavins Point Dam and Lewis and Clark Lake on the north bank of the Missouri River. The area is located mostly in Cedar County, Nebraska, with a small portion located in Yankton County, South Dakota.

History & background
The area is located on a long and narrow strip of land called the Training Dike between the Missouri River and Lake Yankton. The Training Dike was constructed following construction of Gavins Point Dam in order to "train" the river flowing out of the dam and power plant to its current flow, channelizing the river. Although the area is located on the north bank of the Missouri River, it is often incorrectly assumed the area is a part of South Dakota. However upon Nebraska Statehood, the original midpoint of the main channel of the Missouri River was determined to be the state line - which would put the stateline between Cottonwood Recreation Area and Pierson Ranch Recreation Area about 1 mile north of Training Dike.

Recreation
Training Dike Recreation Area is popular for public recreation access along the shoreline of both the Missouri River and Gavins Point Dam tailrace, along with Lake Yankton. The area is popular for fishing immediately downstream of the dam, and the area known as "The Bubble" which is the local name for the outlet of Lake Yankton. There are numerous shore fishing access areas, two boat ramps - one for the Missouri River and Lake Yankton. There are also kayak/canoe launches, a multi-purpose paved trail, picnic areas, swim beach and a demonstration prairie restoration area. There are no camping or overnight facilities located in this recreation area, however multiple campgrounds and additional parks are located within a few miles of the area, including Lewis & Clark Recreation Area, Chief White Crane Recreation Area, Cottonwood Recreation Area, Nebraska Tailwaters Recreation Area and Pierson Ranch Recreation Area.

References

External links
 U.S. Army Corps of Engineers, Lewis and Clark Lake - Gavins Point Project
 Lewis and Clark Lake / Gavins Point Dam Project - Recreation.gov Website

Protected areas of Cedar County, Nebraska
Protected areas of Nebraska
Protected areas of Yankton County, South Dakota
Protected areas of South Dakota